Infante Luís of Portugal, Duke of Beja (3 March 1506, in Abrantes – 27 November 1555, in Marvila, in Lisbon) was the second son of King Manuel I of Portugal and his second wife Maria of Aragon (the third daughter of the Catholic Monarchs). He participated in the Conquest of Tunis.

Early life 

Luís succeeded his father as the Duke of Beja and was also made Constable of the Kingdom (Portuguese: Condestável do Reino) and Prior of the Order of Saint John of Jerusalem, with its Portuguese headquarters in the town of Crato.

Conquest of Tunis 
In the Conquest of Tunis (1535) Luís, brother-in-law of Charles V, commanded the Portuguese army. The Portuguese galleon São João Baptista, also known as Botafogo was specifically requested by Charles V, and it was the most powerful ship in the world at the time, with 366 bronze cannons. It was the Botafogo spur ram that broke up the chains at La Goletta, which defended the port entrance of Tunis, allowing the Christian allied fleet to reach and conquer the city.

Family 
Luís did not marry. He was considered as a potential spouse for his niece Maria Manuela of Portugal at a time when the health of John III's son João Manuel was fragile. Although, when proposed to the king, he refused that possibility and Maria Manuela married instead her cousin Philip, future King of Spain and Portugal.

Between 1537 and 1540, he was also considered as a possible spouse for Henry VIII and Catherine of Aragon's daughter Mary, future Mary I of England, but the idea was later abandoned because of problems with England's succession.

He had a natural son by Violante Gomes, a Pelicana (the she-pelican), a New Christian, who is said to have died a Nun in Almoster, Santarém, on 16 July 1568, daughter of Pedro Gomes, from Évora. Some say they eventually married perhaps at Évora, thus legitimating their issue for every purpose.

Their son António, Prior of Crato, would be one of the claimants to the throne after the death of King Sebastian of Portugal in the disastrous Battle of Alcácer Quibir and the subsequent dynastic crisis that followed, and, according to some historians, the King of Portugal for approximately a month in the year 1580.

Ancestry

See also
Duke of Beja
Conquest of Tunis (1535)
Botafogo (galleon)
João de Sá Panasco
Descendants of Manuel I of Portugal

References

Bibliography
 Nobreza de Portugal e do Brasil – Vol. I, pages 382/384. Published by Zairol Lda., Lisbon 1989.

1506 births
1555 deaths
House of Aviz
105
Portuguese infantes
Portuguese nobility
Portuguese Roman Catholics
People from Abrantes
16th-century Portuguese people
Sons of kings